James Richard Gammon (April 20, 1940 – July 16, 2010) was an American actor, known for playing grizzled "good ol' boy" types in numerous films and television series.
Gammon portrayed Lou Brown, the manager in the movies Major League and Major League II, fictionalized versions of the Cleveland Indians. He was also known for his role as the retired longshoreman Nick Bridges on the CBS television crime drama Nash Bridges.

Biography

Early life
Gammon was born in Newman, Illinois, the son of Doris Latimer (née Toppe), a farm girl, and Donald Gammon, a musician. After his parents divorced, he made his way to Orlando, Florida. He worked at Orlando's ABC TV affiliate WLOF-TV (Channel 9), as a cameraman and director. In his 20s, he packed up and moved to Hollywood to find work.

Acting career
In the 1970s, Gammon helped found the Met Theatre in Los Angeles. While performing there, a rep from The Public Theater saw him and had him cast as Weston in Sam Shepard's Curse of the Starving Class in 1978. The two became friends afterward. He made his sole Broadway appearance as "Dodge" in a revival of Sam Shepard's Buried Child. He was nominated for a Tony Award for his performance. He appeared on stage in Sam Shepard's San Francisco debut of The Late Henry Moss along with Nick Nolte, Sean Penn, Cheech Marin (both of Nash Bridges) and Woody Harrelson in 2000.

Gammon may be best-remembered for his characters Lou Brown, manager of the Cleveland Indians in the Major League films; and Nick Bridges, the father of Don Johnson's title character in the television series Nash Bridges. He appeared in the films Cool Hand Luke (1967), Urban Cowboy (1980), Any Which Way You Can (1980), Silverado (1985), Noon Wine (1985), The Milagro Beanfield War (1988), Major League (1989), Revenge (1990), The Adventures of Huck Finn (1993), Major League II (1994), Wyatt Earp (1994), Wild Bill (1995), Truman (1995), The Hi-Lo Country (1998), Cold Mountain (2003), and more recently Appaloosa (2008). He also had an uncredited role in Natural Born Killers (1994).

Gammon portrayed a Korean War veteran on the hit ABC series Grey's Anatomy. He played Charles Goodnight in Streets of Laredo. In 2006, he played the stern grandfather, Sam, brother of notorious outlaw Butch Cassidy, in the film Outlaw Trail: The Treasure of Butch Cassidy. Gammon also plays a supporting role in Appaloosa (2008).

Gammon provided the voices of the animated characters Marv Loach and Floyd Turbeaux in the 1999 Warner Bros. feature film The Iron Giant.

Personal life
His first marriage ended in divorce. He has a brother, Philip, and a sister, Sandra (Glaudell). He was married to Nancy Jane Kapusta from 1972 until his death. He has two daughters, Allison Mann and Amy Gammon.

Death and legacy
Gammon died of adrenal gland and liver cancer in Costa Mesa, California, at the age of 70.

His friend, Sam Shepard, paid tribute to Gammon, saying: "You're probably aware of the notorious father figures in my plays, alcoholic Midwesterners who leave their families and get lost in the Southwestern desert. Jimmy had that familiarity about him with the way I grew up, the guys with the voice and the face and the whiskey. He definitely rang a bell with me."

Filmography

Film

Television

References

External links
 
 James Gammon(Aveleyman)

1940 births
2010 deaths
Male actors from Illinois
American male film actors
American male television actors
American male voice actors
Deaths from cancer in California
Deaths from liver cancer
20th-century American male actors
21st-century American male actors
People from Douglas County, Illinois
People from Costa Mesa, California
Deaths from adrenocortical cancer